Calditerrivibrio is a genus of bacteria from the family of Deferribacteraceae with one known species (Calditerrivibrio nitroreducens). Calditerrivibrio nitroreducens has been isolated from a hot spring from Yumata in Japan.

References

Further reading 
 
 

Deferribacterota
Bacteria genera
Monotypic bacteria genera